Jatiya Samajtantrik Dal (Siraj) was a socialist political party in Bangladesh.

History
Jatiya Samajtantrik Dal was established in 1972 following a split in Bangladesh Chhatra League. The party split twice during the term of President Ziaur Rahman. It split again during the reign of President Hussain Mohammad Ershad, forming Jatiya Samajtantrik Dal-JSD, led by A. S. M. Abdur Rab, and  Jatiya Samajtantrik Dal (Siraj), led by Shajahan Siraj.

References

 
1972 establishments in Bangladesh
Political parties established in 1972
Defunct political parties in Bangladesh
Socialist parties in Asia
Socialist parties in Bangladesh